Kuro Burger is a product line of hamburger sold by the Japanese franchises of the Burger King fast food restaurant chain. The buns and the cheese of the hamburger are colored black with bamboo charcoal. The ketchup and the onions on the hamburger are colored black with squid ink.

References

External links
 I Ate Burger King Japan's Black Cheeseburger—And the McDonald's One Too at Gawker

Hamburgers (food)
Japanese cuisine
Burger King foods